The First Assignment is a 2010 Italian drama film directed by Giorgia Cecere. It entered into the "Controcampo Italiano" section at the 67th Venice International Film Festival.

Plot

Cast 
Isabella Ragonese as Nena
 Francesco Chiarello as  Giovanni
 Alberto Boll as  Francesco
 Miriana Protopapa as Nena's sister

See also
 List of Italian films of 2010

References

External links

2010 films
Italian drama films
2010 drama films
Films set in Apulia
Films set in the 1950s
2010s Italian-language films
2010s Italian films